Richard Howell Gleaves (July 4, 1819 – November 1907) was a lawyer, merchant, and politician who served as the 55th Lieutenant Governor of South Carolina from December 7, 1872 to December 14, 1876. He served under Governors Franklin J. Moses, Jr. and Daniel Henry Chamberlain. A Haitian-American of mixed ancestry, Gleaves was notable as one of the highest elected black Americans during the Reconstruction Era.

Biography
Richard Howell Gleaves was born free in Philadelphia to a Haitian father, who had immigrated earlier in the century following the Haitian Revolution, and an English mother. He was educated in Philadelphia as well as in New Orleans, where a relatively large free black community existed. He then worked as a steward on Mississippi River steamboats before moving to Ohio and Pennsylvania. While back in the north, Gleaves was an active in the Prince Hall Freemasons, which had primarily African-American membership. He worked to organize Prince Hall lodges across the northern states.

In 1866 following the American Civil War, Gleaves moved to Beaufort, South Carolina. There he went into business with Robert Smalls, a former slave who during the war had captained a ship that he took from the Confederates. Gleaves purchased property in the town. His land included the site of a black fraternal hall now known as the Sons of Beaufort Lodge, located at 607 West Street. Gleaves, like his business partner Robert Smalls, went into politics and helped establish the Union League and the South Carolina Republican Party. He presided over that party's convention in 1867. From 1870–1872, he held multiple elected positions, including trial justice, probate judge and commissioner of elections.

In 1872 and 1874, Gleaves was elected as the 55th Lieutenant Governor of South Carolina. In 1874, he defeated Martin Delany, an African American running as an Independent Republican, for the office. In 1876, Gleaves was a delegate to the 1876 Republican National Convention which chose Ohio Governor Rutherford B. Hayes as its nominee. In the general election, there was massive fraud in South Carolina. The Republican Party officeholders, including Gleaves, were voted out of office. The end of the Reconstruction Era and the removal of federal troops from South Carolina following the 1876 election signified the restoration of essentially one-party rule in the South, and Gleaves was the last Republican Lieutenant Governor of South Carolina until Bob Peeler was elected in the 1994 election.

Democratic Governor Wade Hampton appointed Gleaves to the position of trial justice in Beaufort but he declined and moved out of state. He had been indicted for fraudulent issuance of legislative pay certificates. However, following the 1880 presidential election, he returned to South Carolina when President James A. Garfield appointed him to the lucrative position of special customs inspector. This position lasted until 1882. He spent the end of his life working as a waiter at the Jefferson Club in Washington, D.C.

Gleaves was a prominent Freemason, the sixth National Grand Master of the Prince Hall National Grand Lodge of North America.

See also 
 List of minority governors and lieutenant governors in the United States

References

1819 births
1907 deaths
Lieutenant Governors of South Carolina
American people of English descent
American politicians of Haitian descent
African-American people in South Carolina politics
African-American politicians during the Reconstruction Era
South Carolina Republicans
South Carolina lawyers
Masonic Grand Masters
People from Philadelphia
People from Beaufort, South Carolina
Washington, D.C., Republicans
20th-century African-American people